Johnson Akin Atere is an Anglican bishop in Nigeria:  he is the current Bishop of Awori.

Akin Atere was born in 1956 in Akoko South-West,  Ondo State. He trained then worked as a teacher before entering Immanuel College of Theology, Ibadan in 1985. He was ordained in 1988. He served at Lagos, Ilasamaja and Sango-Ota and Surulere. He was preferred Canon  in 1999, and Archdeacon in 2002. He was Senior Lecturer in Old Testament Studies at the Archbishop Vining College of Theology until his  consecration on 12 January 2009. He has a Ph.D from Lagos State University.

Notes

Living people
Anglican bishops of Awori
21st-century Anglican bishops in Nigeria
People from Ondo State
1956 births
Nigerian educators
Lagos State University alumni
University of Ibadan alumni
Academic staff of the University of Ibadan
Church of Nigeria archdeacons